P'tit Quinquin may refer to:
 P'tit Quinquin (film)
 "P'tit Quinquin" (song)